Dyhrn is a German noble family originally from Saxony.

History 
The family was first mentioned in the 13th century and settled at an early stage in Prussia and Silesia. It was one of the most important, oldest and richest noble families of the Kingdom of Prussia.

The Dyhrn family had an important role in Silesian industry in the 18th and 19th centuries. It was known not just as the owner of several manufactures and mines, but also as one of the biggest landowners in Silesia.

The Barons and Counts of Dyhrn 
The Lords of Dyhrn gained the title of Baron (Reichsfreiherr) in the 17th century from the Habsburg Monarchy and the title of Prussian and Bohemian Count (Reichsgraf) in the second half of the 18th century, which was also the golden age of this family. There are only a few members of this family still living.

Notable members 
 Georg Abraham, Baron of Dyhrn (1620–1671), German chancellor
 George, Baron of Dyhrn (1848–1878), poet
 Konrad Adolph, Count of Dyhrn (1803–1869), politician, author
 Wilhelm Carl, Count of Dyhrn (1749–1813), diplomat
 Johaness of Dyhrn (1400–1460), bishop of Lebus, archdeacon of Lusatia
 Georg Carl, Baron of Dyhrn (1710–1759), the legendary general in Saxony and France
 Ernest, Count of Dyhrn (1769–1842), Prussian chancellor
 Alexandra, Countess of Dyhrn (1873–1945), historian, writer
 Emilie, Countess of Dyhrn (1811–1875), the wife of Gustav Freytag
 Antoinette Louise, Baroness of Dyhrn (1745–1820), entrepreneur and one of the richest women in Prussia
 Sophie Caroline, Countess of Dyhrn (1712–1793), Prussian entrepreneur and landowner
 Amalia, Baroness von Dyhrn (1790–1866), philanthropist and heiress
 Sophia of Dyhrn (1255/1257–1323), the Duchess of Silesia-Liegnitz 
 Hedwig Maximiliane, Imperial Countess of Dyhrn (1699–1747), lady-in-waiting and dame of the Order of the Starry Cross

Literature
 
 

Dyhrn